The Tirana plain is a plain in Central Albania, part of the Western Lowlands, where its main populated center is the capital city of Tirana.

References

Plains of Albania